The exact date of the first African slaves in Connecticut is unknown, but the narrative of Venture Smith provides some information about the life of northern slavery in Connecticut. Another early confirmed account of slavery in the English colony came in 1638 when several native prisoners were taken during the Pequot War were exchanged in the West Indies for African slaves. Such exchanges become common in subsequent conflicts.

Legal history of abolition in Connecticut

Connecticut blocked the importation of slaves in 1774, via the passage in the state legislature of the "Act for Prohibiting the Importation of Indian, Negro or Molatto Slaves" and began a gradual emancipation of slaves in 1784, through the passage by the state legislature of the "Gradual Abolition Act" of that year. Through this "freeing the womb" act, all slaves born after March 1, 1784, would become free upon attaining the age of 25 for men and 21 for women, though it did not free the parents, or any other adult slaves.

1848 slavery abolition

In 1844, Governor Roger Sherman Baldwin proposed legislation to end slavery, but the General Assembly did not pass it until it was reintroduced in 1848 as "An Act to Prevent Slavery". The last person enslaved in Connecticut, Nancy Toney of Windsor, died in December 1857. 

Lieutenant Thomas R. Gedney steered La Amistad into Connecticut as opposed to the state of New York in 1839 because at the time slavery was still legal in Connecticut in the 1830s.

Nancy Toney of Windsor (1774 - December 19, 1857) 
Nancy was baptized on November 27, 1774, probably as an infant, in Christ’s Church. Abigail Sherwood Chaffee Loomis inherited Nancy from Dr. Chaffee Jr. after his death in 1821. His will, dated 1818, specifically bequeathed “to my Daughter Abigail S. Loomis, wife of Col. James Loomis…my negro slave Nance.” In the 1830 federal census, Nancy is surprisingly listed as a “free colored female.” No extant Windsor records prove Nancy’s freedom as it is categorized in the federal census; therefore, it is possible that the Loomis family began labeling Nancy as a free person without actually granting her freedom. The 1850 US Census, the first to name residents other than the head of household, listed Nancy, a 72-year-old free black woman, residing with James and Abigail Loomis.

Prevalence of slavery
According to Anne Farrow, Joel Lang, and Jenifer Frank, "In 1790 most prosperous merchants in Connecticut owned at least one slave, as did 50 percent of the ministers. ...Our economic links to slavery were deeply entwined with our religious, political, and educational institutions. Slavery was part of the social contract in Connecticut."

According to U.S. census data there were 2,764 slaves in Connecticut as of 1790, a little over 1% of the population at the time. This declined during the early part of the 19th century, with the census indicating numbers (percentages) reported as slaves in the State of 951 (.34%) in 1800, 97 (.04%) in 1820 and 25 (.008%) by 1830.

See also
 Andrew T. Judson
 Canterbury Female Boarding School
 James Mars
 Nero Hawley
 New Haven Excitement (Simeon Jocelyn)
 Samuel Joseph May
 Titus Gay aka Old Ti
 Titus Kent

References

Further reading

 

Pre-statehood history of Connecticut
Connecticut
History of racism in Connecticut
Slavery in the British Empire